Netra may refer to:

Places
 Netra, Canning, village in Canning Subdivision, South 24 Parganas, West Bengal, India
 Netra, Diamond Harbour, village in Diamond Harbour Subdivision, South 24 Parganas, West Bengal, India
 Netra, Gujarat, village in Kutch District, Gujarat, India
 Netra, Jodhpur, village in Jodhpur District, Rajasthan, India
 Netra, Pali, village in Pali District, Rajasthan, India

Things
 Netra, a natural gas pipeline system in Germany
 Sun Netra, the server computer line from Sun Microsystems 
 DRDO Netra
 DRDO NETRA
 DRDO AEW&CS

See also

Netta (disambiguation)